Naval Security Group Activity, Winter Harbor was a radio station of the United States Navy that operated from 1935 to 2002.

History 
In the early 1930s, Otter Cliffs Radio Station on Mount Desert Island was literally falling apart. John D. Rockefeller, Jr., then developing the infrastructure of Acadia National Park, sought to locate the park's main loop road through the Otter Cliffs area. The Navy was willing to meet Rockefeller halfway on the removal of the radio station from Otter Cliffs, agreeing to relocate if a suitable site could be found on the coast within  of Otter Cliffs.

Rockefeller, wishing the station's buildings to be compatible with others designed for the park, retained Grosvenor Atterbury, the New York architect who designed the park's gatehouses, to come up with plans for the radio station.  Atterbury's plan for the new station included a beautiful residence hall similar to Mr. Rockefeller's residence at Seal Harbor. Artisans from all over the world contributed to the project.  This building, and the adjacent power station which was also designed by Atterbury, were listed on the National Register of Historic Places in 2013.

On 28 February 1935, the U.S. Navy Radio and Direction Finding Station Winter Harbor was officially commissioned with Chief Radioman Max Gunn in charge of a complement of an 11 personnel crew.

The station's name has changed several times over the years. In 1944, it was changed to Supplementary Radio Station, U.S. Naval Radio Station Winter Harbor. In 1950, it became known as U.S. Naval Radio Station (Receiver). The present station name, Naval Security Group Activity, Winter Harbor, became official on 9 June 1958.

In 2001, the base transitioned from an operational posture to focusing on the closure process, with the ultimate goal of transferring the Schoodic parcel to the National Park Service. The last System Maintenance Training Course graduated in July 2001. The AN/FRD-10 Wullenweber Antenna and Classic Wizard antennas came down in August. The last service was held at the Chapel 2 September 2001, and the Foc'sle Galley served its last meal on 28 September 2001.

Redevelopment 
After the base was closed in 2002, the National Park Service (NPS) acquired the land and established the Schoodic Education and Research Center (SERC). The SERC campus is managed by the nonprofit Schoodic Institute and the NPS in a public-private partnership as one of 19 NPS research learning centers in the country. The center is dedicated to supporting scientific research in the park, providing professional development for teachers, and educating students who will become the next generation of park stewards.

Commanders 
Radio Direction Finding Station:CRM M. C. Gunn, CRM O. C. Coonce, CRM F. L. Freeman, CRM J. W. Pearson, CRM/LTJG M. C. Gunn, LTJG L. A. Lankford
Supplementary Naval Station:LTJG H. I. Maltz, CRE L. A. Newbury, LTJG M. C. Gunn, LTJG C. M. Smith, LCDR H. L. Kisner
Naval Radio Station (Receiver):LCDR F. V. Mason, CDR K. B. Kohler, CDR S. E. Hazelett, LCDR I. E. Willis, LCDR M. C. Morris, LCDR J. L. Koon
Naval Group Support Activity:LCDR J. L. Koon, CDR T. J. Quick, CDR C. G. Lawrence, CDR S. T. Faulkner, CDR T. F. Hahn, CDR H. J. Davis, CDR J. F. Williamson, LCDR D. K. Layman, CDR G. C. Lawrence Montgomery Jr., CAPT J. D. Wood Jr., CAPT A. D. McEachen III, CAPT M. J. Whelan Jr., CAPT R. K. Lunde, CAPT T. F. Stevens, CAPT E. R. Dittmer, CAPT H. W. Whiton, CAPT J. T. Mitchell, CDR E. J. Kurzanski, CDR S. K. Tucker, CDR M. S. Rogers, CDR E. F. Williamson, CDR J. W. Guest

See also 
National Register of Historic Places listings in Hancock County, Maine
National Register of Historic Places listings in Acadia National Park

References 

Military installations in Maine
Buildings and structures in Hancock County, Maine
Military facilities on the National Register of Historic Places in Maine
1935 establishments in Maine
2002 disestablishments in Maine
National Register of Historic Places in Hancock County, Maine
National Register of Historic Places in Acadia National Park
Communications and electronic installations of the United States Navy
Winter Harbor, Maine
Military installations closed in 2002
Closed installations of the United States Navy